Ralph Midgley was the Guvan ('Administrator') of the Volapük Community (according to an edict of the former Cifal Brian Bishop made on 1 January 2006). He has been working with Volapük since 1972. He is the author of a number of online teaching courses released under the names Volapük for Everyone and Volapük in Action, as well as a brief introduction called Volapük vifik ('Quick Volapük'). He formed the Flenef Bevünetik Volapüka ('The International Community of Friends of Volapük'), and has published a magazine Vög Volapüka ('The Voice of Volapük') which followed on from a publication known as Sirkülapenäd ('The Newsletter'). His enthusiastic activism in promoting Volapük is responsible for the majority of people who currently study and learn the language.

He became the administrator of the Volapük movement in 2006 and was a member of the Volapük Academy from 2007 until 2015. In 2015, he stepped down from all of his engagements in the Volapük movement due to his age and failing eyesight. He has been an honorary academician (stimakadämal) of the International Volapük Society since December 1, 2015 according to an official edict by the current Cifal, Hermann Phillips..

Midgley lives in Scunthorpe in northern England.

Midgley is notable for having translated Alice's Adventures in Wonderland in to both Neo and Volapük; the Volapük translation is forthcoming.

References

External links 
In Volapük and English:
 Volapük Vifik: "Quick Volapük", a brief introduction for beginners.
 Flenef bevünetik Volapüka.
 , Midgley's first magazine in Volapük.
 Volapükagrup Yahoo discussion list where Midgley is active.
 L’Aventuros d’Alis in Marvoland Translation of Alice's Adventures in Wonderland into Neo.

Living people
Linguists from the United Kingdom
Translators to Volapük
Volapükologists
Year of birth missing (living people)
Place of birth missing (living people)